Ohio's 25th senatorial district has always been based in the Cleveland metro.  It comprises the eastern portion of Cuyahoga County and the western portion of Lake County. It encompasses Ohio House districts 8, 12 and 60. It has a Cook PVI of D+20.  Its Ohio Senator is Democrat Bill DeMora.  He resides in Columbus, a city located in Franklin County.

List of senators

External links
Ohio's 25th district senator at the 133rd Ohio General Assembly official website

Ohio State Senate districts